Mohamed Al Ghanodi (born 22 November 1992) is a Libyan international footballer who plays for Al-Ahli as a striker. He is a member of Libya national football team, played a match against Senegal in 2012 Africa Cup of Nations.

International career

International goals
Scores and results list Libya's goal tally first.

References

External links

1992 births
Living people
Libyan footballers
Libya international footballers
Association football forwards
2012 Africa Cup of Nations players
Al-Ahli SC (Tripoli) players
Libyan Premier League players
Libya A' international footballers
2014 African Nations Championship players